The men's 110 metres hurdles event at the 2000 Asian Athletics Championships was held in Jakarta, Indonesia on 29–30 August.

Medalists

Results

Heats
Wind:Heat 1: +0.4 m/s, Heat 2: +0.3 m/s

Final
Wind: +0.7 m/s

References

2000 Asian Athletics Championships
Sprint hurdles at the Asian Athletics Championships